The Jefferson County Courthouse is a building located in Rigby, Idaho listed on the National Register of Historic Places.

It was one of three nearly identical courthouses designed by Sundberg & Sundberg for 1938 Works Progress Administration projects.

The Jerome County Courthouse, the Oneida County Courthouse, and this one all are two-story buildings with five-bay fronts and have elaborate terra cotta entries.

The building was demolished March 15, 2016.

See also

 List of National Historic Landmarks in Idaho
 National Register of Historic Places listings in Jefferson County, Idaho

References

1938 establishments in Idaho
2016 disestablishments in Idaho
Art Deco architecture in Idaho
Buildings and structures demolished in 2016
Buildings and structures in Jefferson County, Idaho
Courthouses on the National Register of Historic Places in Idaho
Demolished buildings and structures in Idaho
National Register of Historic Places in Jefferson County, Idaho